Roniel Campos Lucena (born 27 July 1993) is a Venezuelan professional racing cyclist, who currently rides for UCI Continental team .

Major results

2011
 1st  Time trial, National Junior Road Championships
2014
 1st  Young rider classification Volta do Paraná
 2nd Time trial, National Under-23 Road Championships
 7th Time trial, National Road Championships
2016
 National Road Championships
3rd Road race 
6th Time trial
 7th Overall Vuelta al Tachira
2017
 5th Overall Vuelta al Tachira
1st Stage 7
 7th Time trial, National Road Championships
2019
 8th Overall Vuelta al Tachira
1st  Mountains classification
2020
 1st  Overall Vuelta al Tachira
2021
 1st  Overall Vuelta al Tachira
1st  Points classification
1st Stages 2, 3 & 5 
2022
 1st  Overall Vuelta al Tachira
1st  Mountains classification
1st Stage 6

References

External links

1993 births
Living people
Venezuelan male cyclists
People from Yaracuy